The 2002 NCAA Rifle Championships were contested at the 23rd annual NCAA-sanctioned competition to determine the team and individual national champions of co-ed collegiate rifle shooting in the United States. The championship was hosted by Murray State University in Murray, Kentucky. 

Three-time defending champions Alaska once again topped the team standings, finishing 31 points (6,241–6,209) points ahead of Kentucky. This was the Nanooks' fourth consecutive and fifth overall team title.

Matthew Emmons (Alaska) repeated as the individual national champion for the smallbore rifle whereas Ryan Tanoue (Nevada) claimed the title for the air rifle.

Qualification
With only one national collegiate championship for rifle shooting, all NCAA rifle programs (whether from Division I, Division II, or Division III) were eligible. A total of ten teams contested this championship, a return to the size of the original two championships in 1980 and 1981.

Results
Scoring:  The championship consisted of 120 shots by each competitor in smallbore and 40 shots per competitor in air rifle.

Team title
(H) = Hosts
(DC) = Defending champions
Italics = Inaugural championship

Individual events

References

NCAA Rifle Championship
2002 in shooting sports
NCAA Rifle Championships